Nonô (full name : Claudionor Gonçalves da Silva; 1 January 1899 – 24 July 1931) was a Brazilian football forward for the Clube de Regatas do Flamengo. Nonô was born and died in Rio de Janeiro.  He made one appearance for the Brazil national football team in the 1921 Copa América against Argentina.

See also
 List of Clube de Regatas do Flamengo players

References

External links
 Profile at cbf.com.br
 

1899 births
1931 deaths
Footballers from Rio de Janeiro (city)
Brazilian footballers
Brazil international footballers
CR Flamengo footballers
Association football forwards